Gouripur is an upazila located in the Mymensingh District of Bangladesh.

Demographics
According to the 2011 Bangladesh census, Gouripur had a population of 323,057. Males constituted 49.44% of the population and females 50.56%. Muslims formed 95.97% of the population, Hindus 3.92%, Christians 0.02% and others 0.11%. Gouripur had a literacy rate of 43.64% for the population 7 years and above.

At the 1991 Bangladesh census, Gauripur had a population of 247945, of whom 125,167 were aged 18 or older. Males constituted 50.71% of the population, and females 49.29%. Gauripur had an average literacy rate of 26.4% (7+ years), against the national average of 32.4%.

Administration
Gouripur Upazila is divided into Gouripur Municipality and ten union parishads: Achintapur, Bhangnamari, Bokainagar, Douhakhola, Gouripur, Mailakanda, Maoha, Ramgopalpur, Sahanati, and Sidhla. The union parishads are subdivided into 245 mauzas and 289 villages.

Gouripur Municipality is subdivided into 9 wards and 34 mahallas.

See also
 Upazilas of Bangladesh
 Districts of Bangladesh
 Divisions of Bangladesh

References

Upazilas of Mymensingh District